Michel Cormier (born December 22, 1945) is a Canadian former professional ice hockey winger who played 182 games in the World Hockey Association. He played with the Phoenix Roadrunners.

References

External links

1945 births
Canadian ice hockey left wingers
Charlotte Checkers (EHL) players
French Quebecers
Ice hockey people from Quebec
Living people
Phoenix Roadrunners (WHA) players
Sportspeople from Trois-Rivières
Canadian expatriate ice hockey players in the United States